Ranunculaceae (buttercup or crowfoot family; Latin  "little frog", from  "frog") is a family of over 2,000 known species of flowering plants in 43 genera,  distributed worldwide.

The largest genera are Ranunculus (600 species), Delphinium (365), Thalictrum (330), Clematis (325), and Aconitum (300).

Description 

Ranunculaceae are mostly herbaceous annuals or perennials, but some are woody climbers (such as Clematis) or shrubs (e.g. Xanthorhiza).

Most members of the family have bisexual flowers which can be showy or inconspicuous. Flowers are solitary, but are also found aggregated in cymes, panicles, or spikes. The flowers are usually radially symmetrical  but are also found to be  bilaterally symmetrical in the genera Aconitum and Delphinium. The sepals, petals, stamens and carpels are all generally free (not fused), the outer flower segments typically number four or five. The outer stamens may be modified to produce only nectar, as in Aquilegia, Helleborus and Delphinium.

In some genera, such as Thalictrum the sepals are colorful and appear petal-like (petaloid) and the petals can be inconspicuous or absent. The stems are unarmed. The leaves are variable. Most species have both basal and cauline (stem) leaves, which are usually compound or lobed but can be simple. They are typically alternate, or occasionally opposite or even whorled. Many species, especially the perennials form rhizomes that develop new roots each year. Ficaria verna can reproduce vegetatively by means of root tubers produced in the leaf axils. Some members of the genus Thalictrum utilize anemophily while others utilize entomophily. Flowers of the entomophilous genus Papaver, also of the Ranunculales order, produce only pollen. Until recently, it was believed that the species of the genus Anemone also lack nectar.

The fruits are most commonly free, unfused achenes (e.g. Ranunculus, Clematis) or follicles (e.g. Helleborus, Eranthis, Nigella), but a berry in Actaea.

Phytochemistry 

Ranunculaceae contain protoanemonin, which is toxic to humans and animals. Contact with plant sap may cause inflammation and blistering of the skin, while ingestion can cause irritation of the mouth, vomiting, and diarrhea.
Other poisonous or toxic compounds, alkaloids and glycosides, are also common.

Taxonomy

Takhtajan (1997) included the Ranunculaceae as the only family in the Ranunculales which he placed in a subclass, the Ranunculidae, instead of a superorder.   Previously, Thorn (1992) placed the Ranunculaceae in the Berberidales, an order within the Superorder Magnolianae. Earlier Cronquist in 1981 included the Ranunculaceae along with seven other families in the Rancunculales which was included in the Magnoliidae, which he regarded as a subclass. David, (2010) placed the Ranuculaceae, together with the Eupteleaceae, Lardizabalaceae, Menispermaceae, Berberidaceae, and Papaveraceae in the Ranunculales, the only order in the superorder Ranunculanae.  This follows the work of the Angiosperm Phylogeny Group.

The family Ranunculaceae sensu stricto is one of seven families included in the order Ranunculales within the  eudicots according to the Angiosperm Phylogeny Group (APG) classification. The family is monophyletic with Glaucidium as sister to the remaining genera. This phylogeny is illustrated in the APG Poster.

Subdivision 

Early subdivisions of the family, such as Michel Adanson (1763), simply divided it based on one-seeded or many-seeded fruit. Prantl (1887) envisaged three tribes, Paeonieae, Hellebroreae and Anemoneae with Paeonia, Glaucidium and Hydrastis forming Paeonieae. By the twentieth century Langlet (1932) used chromosome types to create two subfamilies, Ranunculoideae and Thalictroideae. In 1966 Tamura further developed Langlet's system by adding floral characteristics with six subfamilies;
 Helleboroideae  
 Ranunculoideae
 Isopyroideae
 Thalictroideae
 Coptidoideae
 Hydrastidoideae

but by 1988 he had reduced Coptidoideae to a tribe within Isopyroideae, leaving five subfamilies, an arrangement he continued in his 1993 monograph, dividing the larger subfamilies into tribes, though by then Paeonia and Glaucidium were no longer considered to belong to Ranunculaceae. Paeonia was separated from Ranuculaceae and placed in its own family of Paeoniaceae (order Saxifragales). other genera originally included in Ranunculaceae include Circaeaster  which was placed in its own family Circaeasteraceae.

Tamura's complete system was structured as follows;
Subfamilies and tribes
 Subfamily Ranunculoideae Hutch.
 Adonideae Kunth
 Anemoneae DC.
 Ranunculeae DC.
 Subfamily Helleboroideae Hutch.
 Helleboreae DC.
 Cimicifugeae Torrey & A.Gray
 Delphineae Schrödinger
 Nigelleae Schrödinger
 Subfamily Isopyroideae Tamura
 Coptideae Langlet ex Tamura & K.Kosuge
 Dichocarpeae Tamura & K.Kosuge
 Isopyreae Schrödinger
 Subfamily Thalictroideae
 Subfamily Hydrastidoideae

The genus Glaucidium, having been moved to its own family (Glaucidiaceae), has since been restored to Ranuculaceae.

Molecular phylogenetics 

When subjected to molecular phylogenetic analysis only Thalictroideae is monophyletic. The position of Glaucidium and some of its unique morphological characteristics prompted Stevens to suggest that it be given subfamilial rank as the monotypic Glaucidioideae. Similarly Hydrastis has been assigned to subfamily Hydrastidoideae. Both genera are represented by a single species, Glaucidium palmatum and Hydrastis canadense respectively.

The relationships between the genera suggest the existence of three major clades corresponding to Coptidoideae, Thalictroideae (clade A) and Ranunculoideae (clade F). The latter is the largest with four subclades (B–E). Of these C corresponds to Delphineae, D to Cimicifugae and E to Ranunculoideae. Consequently, Wang and colleagues (2009) proposed a new classification with five subfamilies, and further subdividing Ranunculoideae into ten tribes. The relationship between the subfamilies is shown in the cladogram;

In addition to the two monotypic subgenera, Coptoideae has 17 species and Thalictroideae has 450, including Thalictrum and Aquilegia. The other genera (2025 species, 81% of the family) belong to Ranunculoideae. Kingdonia had been included by Tamura in Anemoneae, but is now added to Circaeasteraceae.

Subfamilies of Ranunculaceae (5) and tribes of Ranunculoideae 
Glaucidioideae (Tamura) Loconte (1)
Hydrastidoideae Engler (1)
Coptidoideae Tamura (2) 
Thalictroideae Raf. (10)
Ranunculoideae Arn. (46)
Adonideae Kunth
Delphinieae Schröd.
Nigelleae Schröd.
Helleboreae DC.
Cimicifugeae Torr. and A.Gray
Caltheae Bercht. and J.Presl
Asteropyreae W.T.Wang and C. Y.Chang
Callianthemeae W.Wang and Z. D.Chen
Anemoneae DC.
Ranunculeae DC.

Genera 
Ranunculaceae contains approximately 43 genera.

 Subfamily Glaucidioideae
 Glaucidium Siebold & Zuccarini
 Subfamily Hydrastidoideae
 Hydrastis L.
 Subfamily Coptidoideae
 Coptis Salisb.
 Xanthorhiza Marshall
 Subfamily Thalictroideae
 Aquilegia L.
 Dichocarpum W.T.Wang & P.K.Hsiao
 Enemion Rafinesque
 Isopyrum L.
 Leptopyrum Reichenbach
 Paraquilegia J.R.Drumm. & Hutch.
 Paropyrum Ulbr.
 Semiaquilegia Makino
 Thalictrum L.
 Urophysa Ulbr.
 Subfamily Ranunculoideae
 Tribe Adonideae
 Adonis L.
 Megaleranthis Ohwi
 Trollius L.
 Tribe Delphinieae
 Aconitum L.
 Consolida Gray
 Delphinium L.
 Tribe Nigelleae
 Nigella L.
 Tribe Helleboreae
 Helleborus L.
 Tribe Cimicifugeae
 Actaea L.
 Anemonopsis Siebold & Zuccarini
 Beesia Balf.f. & W.W.Sm.
 Cimicifuga Wernisch.
 Eranthis Salisb.
 Souliea Franch.
 Tribe Caltheae
 Caltha L.
 Tribe Asteropyreae
 Asteropyrum J.R.Drumm. & Hutch.
 Tribe Callianthemeae
 Callianthemum C.A.Mey.
 Tribe Anemoneae
 Anemoclema (Franch.) W.T.Wang
 Anemone L.
 Clematis L.
 Hepatica Mill.
 Naravelia Adans.
 Pulsatilla Mill.
 Tribe Ranunculeae
 Barneoudia Gay
 Calathodes Hook.f. & Thomson
 Callianthemoides Tamura
 Ceratocephala Moench
 Ficaria Guett.
 Halerpestes Greene
 Hamadryas Comm. ex Juss.
 Knowltonia Salisb.
 Krapfia DC.
 Laccopetalum Ulbr.
 Metanemone W.T.Wang
 Miyakea Miyabe & Tatew.
 Myosurus L.
 Oreithales Schltdl.
 Oxygraphis Bunge
 Paroxygraphis W.W.Sm.
 Ranunculus L.
 Trautvetteria Fisch. & C.A.Mey.

Previous genera
 Anemonella Spach → Thalictrum
 Psychrophila (DC.) Bercht. & J.Presl → Caltha

Fossil record 

Fossils of fruits, pollen, seeds, and leaves are known from several dozen locations.  The fossil record begins in the early Cretaceous and continues throughout the Tertiary. In most cases, the fossils are assigned to extant genera, or show a close relationship to a particular extant genus.

Uses 

Some Ranunculaceae are used as herbal medicines because of their alkaloids and glycosides, such as Hydrastis canadensis (goldenseal), whose root is used as a tonic. More than 30 species are used in homeopathy, including Aconitum napellus,  Cimicifuga racemosa, Clematis recta, Clematis virginiana, Hydrastis canadensis, Ranunculus bulbosus, Helleborus niger, Delphinium staphisagria, Pulsatilla nigricans. Many genera are well known as cultivated flowers, such as Aconitum (monkshood), Clematis, Consolida (larkspur), Delphinium, Helleborus (Christmas rose), Trollius (globeflower). The seeds of  Nigella sativa are used as a spice in Indian and Middle Eastern cuisine.

Gallery

Tribes of subfamily Ranunculoideae

Other subfamilies

Notes

References

Bibliography

 
 
 
 
 Langlet, O. (1932). Uber Chromosomenverhaltnisse und Systematik der Ranunculaceae. Svensk Bot. Tidskr 26, 381–401.
 
 
 
 , in  
 Strasburger, Noll, Schenck, Schimper: Lehrbuch der Botanik für Hochschulen. 4. Auflage, Gustav Fischer, Jena 1900, p. 459 (flower diagrams)
 
 
 Sandro Pignatti. Flora d'Italia, Edagricole, Bologna 1982.

External links

Flora of North America: Ranunculaceae
Flora of China: Ranunculaceae
Ranunculaceae in Topwalks
Ranunculaceae in BoDD – Botanical Dermatology Database
Ranunculaceae in L. Watson and M.J. Dallwitz (1992 onwards). The families of flowering plants.
NCBI Taxonomy Browser
 links at CSDL, Texas
Japanese Ranunculaceae - Flavon's art gallery
Family Ranunculaceae Flowers in Israel
Cai et al. Molecular phylogeny of Ranunculaceae based on internal transcribed spacer sequences 2009
Aconitum heterophyllum (fam. Ranunculaceae) at the Encyclopedia of Ayurvedic Medicinal Plants

 
Eudicot families
Extant Cretaceous first appearances